Opened on the 8th of October 1998, the only high-speed rail in Norway, on the railways of Norway is on Gardermobanen, a 64 kilometer line between Oslo Central Station and Eidsvoll via Oslo Airport. The main service on this route is Flytoget, commuting between Oslo Airport and the metropolitan areas of Oslo at speeds of up to 210 km/h (130 mph). It was extended westwards to include the city of Drammen in 2008, though not at high speed. The high-speed section is also used by express and regional trains between Oslo and Eidsvoll.

In September 2010, Jernbaneverket awarded several contracts for research into new high-speed routes in Norway. These focus on six routes; five from Oslo to Bergen, Kristiansand/Stavanger, Trondheim, Gothenburg, and Stockholm, plus a sixth coastal route through Bergen, Haugesund and Stavanger.

Background
Compared to continental European countries, Norway is far more sparsely populated and quite mountainous. On the one hand this causes problems filling up trains, especially compared to other European projects and will give difficulties reaching necessary passenger numbers. On the other hand, Norwegians travel considerably more long-distance than other Europeans, for instance three of Europe's 11 busiest air routes are within Norway. Also, the long-distance road network of Norway has relatively low average speed, making air travel the main long-distance travel option today. The slow roads make it easier for trains to compete, even though the road network also is being upgraded. For example, a 4-lane motorway from Oslo to Hamar was opened in the early 2020s. The difficult geography with fjords and mountains has historically meant circuitous routes of both roads and rail lines.

Estimates for construction costs have shown that building in Norway is considerably cheaper than on the continent, due to the ability to build tracks straight on bedrock. Also the tunnels usually can be made without sealing (like the many road tunnels). Furthermore, expropriation costs are lower since most of the corridors will go through unpopulated areas.

So far, train speed has not been prioritised on long-distance railways in Norway. Oslo-Bergen (526 km) takes about 6:40 in 2023. Oslo-Trondheim (552 km) takes 6:45. These times are about the same as during the last decades, and give an average speed of about 80 km/h. Oslo-Gothenburg is a little faster at 89 km/h, but this is due to Swedish rail quality (112 km/h) rather than Norwegian (72 km/h).

As can be seen in the chapter "Future plans", not much will be built before 2020, and no new track will be operated above 200 km/h in this time. If there is a decision to really build new long-distance high-speed lines it will represent a big change in national transport policy. The situation changed in 2018 after new transportation investment plan. It is claimed that additional 270 km of high-speed lines will be built until 2029.

Plans
There are currently plans to build a few 200 km/h railways in the near future. This limit of 200 km/h might be raised slightly in the future on certain straight sections of track. Around 2012 a decision was made to try allowing speeds of 250 km/h on new projects, because an EU directive mandates this on new mainlines.
Between Oslo–Ski, the new Follo Line is under construction, estimated to open December 2022, engineered for a speed of 250 km/h.
A new high-speed track for Vestfoldbanen, Drammen–Tønsberg is to be finished around 2024.
A new railway is being built between Holm and Nykirke allowing 250 km/h is due to open in November 2016, almost all in tunnel. It will be the first railroad section that allows 250 km/h and includes a new Holmestrand station. 
A new railway is being built between Larvik and Porsgrunn allowing 250 km/h is due to open in 2018, mostly in tunnel.
The rest of the railway Drammen–Skien will be upgraded.
A new railway will be built between Porsgrunn and the Sørlandet Line around Risør, mostly in tunnel. No decided time schedule.
The new track Eidsvoll–Hamar on the Dovre Line is expected to be finished around 2024, with 200 km/h most of the track.
A new railway built between Langset and Kleverud allowing 200 km/h was opened in December 2015. 
A new track Ringeriksbanen Oslo–Hønefoss, mostly in a tunnel, will cut travel time between those two cities with up to one hour (indicated time gains depend on political prioritisations.) No decided time plan.
In about 1995 a new double track Ski-Moss was constructed, which is straight enough for 200 km/h for most of the route. However, only 160 km/h is permitted on this stretch (with an average speed of just 105 km/h). The route can easily be upgraded.

Long-term plans
There is also a political climate for building more high-speed railway services in Norway. The Norwegian National Railway Administration, Jernbaneverket, has paid for an analysis on the possibilities for building high-speed railway services in Norway. The VWI Stuttgart (Institute of Transportation Research at the University of Stuttgart, Germany) has done this analysis.

The conclusions indicate that the most promising corridors are Oslo-Gothenburg (in Sweden) and Oslo-Trondheim (through the Østerdalen valley). The Oslo-Bergen corridor could expect the highest passenger count, but is much more expensive to build.

According to the report, the lines are assumed to be single-track railways, with up to 4% grade, dedicated to high-speed passenger trains with a 250 km/h (155 mph) maximum cruise speed. Closer to the big cities, the railways would be double-track and also be used for regional trains.

The feasibility study has suggested that a passenger count of 5000 per day per line could be expected if rail is competitive with air travel. This is much lower than German or French high-speed lines, and building double tracks will not be economical. It will, however, be hard to get below three hours from Oslo to Bergen or Trondheim on single track, as meeting trains will be very sensitive to delays. Travel time above three hours makes it hard to compete with air travel. There is no single-track high-speed railway in operation in the world at the moment (one such, the Botniabanan in Sweden is built for 250 km/h, but does not operate above 200). The VWI investigation suggests very long passing loops (15 km) to be able to pass at 160 km/h, and accept some delays without delaying meeting trains. Since these railways would be high-speed only, the passing loops need only to be 30 minutes travel time (80–100 km) apart (assuming one train per hour per direction).

Though the initiative to the analysis itself is an evidence of a promising political climate for high-speed railways, the analysis has been heavily criticized for not being done by a recognised competence in this area, for being based on inaccurate facts, and for using gross miscalculations of important data, like potential passenger numbers and potential costs of building new high-speed tracks.  Mainly these criticisms are from lobbyist organisations which prefer railways to Bergen and Ålesund, which has been seen as too expensive by VWI. Especially the recommendation by WVI to use Østerdalen (with very sparse population) and only one stop there has been criticised.

The Red-green coalition government did, with support from the Progress party and the Conservative Party, declare in 2013 that there will be no high-speed railways outside the regional network around Oslo until at least year 2030. They claim it is a waste of money. Their opinion became opposite after new plans approved in 2018, government decided to spend more to transportation as a reaction to the same decisions abroad.

Suggestions for high-speed railway networks 

There are also some independent initiatives for high-speed railways in Norway:

 Norsk Bane is an initiative for a high-speed railway network that will cover large parts of Southern Norway. It is backed by local organisations like municipalities. It has several lines that can be considered independently, but at its greatest extent it will include the major cities of Bergen, Kristiansand, Stavanger, Trondheim  and Ålesund with a hub in Oslo. In addition there will also be a line through the Vestfold region and lines both west and east of the Mjøsa lake. This project will however need political support before it can be started. Norsk Bane has criticised the VWI investigation mainly because it did not prioritise railways to Hordaland and Møre og Romsdal. Norsk Bane has been criticised because they assume 250 km/h average speed (between stops) at 250 km/h cruise speed and assuming 2:30 travel time Oslo-Trondheim including seven stops (490 km). This is not possible even on a double track railway.
 Den sørnorske høyhastighetsringen  was a political initiative (around 2005) for building a high-speed railway ring that will include the major cities Oslo, Bergen, Stavanger and Kristiansand, in addition to the densely populated Vestfold region. This proposal wants to use the existing corridors of Bergensbanen and along the south coast. This is also a lobbyist organisation backed by local forces.
 A lobby organisation, Oslo-Sthlm 2.55, led by the swedish counties of Värmland and Örebro has proposed a high-speed railway Oslo–Stockholm. Trains take over 5 hours at present, making air travel leading with 1.4 million passengers 2019. The aim is to have below three hours. One hour would be saved by a new railway between Arvika and Lillestrøm or Ski in Norway. More time would be saved by new railways or widening single track to double track almost all the way to Stockholm. As of 2020 this has gained some interest from the Norwegian Government, but the Norwegian or Swedish railway administration have not made any official pilot study.

References

External links
Jernbaneverket projects 

 
Proposed railway lines in Norway